Yes, Sir. Sorry, Sir! (Cantonese: 點解阿Sir係阿Sir), is a 2011 Hong Kong television drama starring Moses Chan, Linda Chung, Tavia Yeung and Ron Ng. Produced by Lau Kar Ho. Yes Sir. Sorry, Sir! is a TVB production.

"阿Sir" is a way to address both teachers and policemen. The meaning of the title is "So it turns out '阿Sir'(teacher) was an '阿Sir'(policeman)".

Plot
Despite the fact that he comes from a long line of disciplined workers, Law Yiu-wah (Moses Chan) is a teacher of a notorious school. One day, he was urged to resign after being vilified by his students as a peeping Tom.
At present, the triads have expanded their drug network at local schools. Wah, who has turned into a cop, is told to go undercover at the school where he used to teach.
At school, he is impressed by the enthusiasm of a new teacher Ho Miu-suet (Tavia Yeung). He also comes to realize he was too strict with his students in the past. With a determination to boost students’ confidence, Suet invites bowling expert Koo Ka-lam (Linda Chung) to teach bowling at the school.
When Wah learns about her triad background, he decides to go after her hoping to learn more about the triads. Wah also finds himself in a contest of wits with Inspector Ching Man-lik (Ron Ng), who has been assigned to work as a liaison officer at the school.
On one hand, Man is attracted to Suet but on the other, she only loves Wah. All of a sudden, Wah, Suet, Lam and Lik find themselves involved in a complicated love square.

Cast

Moses Chan as Law Yiu-wah
Linda Chung as Carman Koo Ka-lam
Tavia Yeung as Ho Miu-suet
Ron Ng as Nick Ching Man-lik
Ram Chiang as Poon Kwok-shing
Law Lok-lam as Chiang Hung
Joseph Lee as Ko Sun
Savio Tsang as Ngai Fung
Queenie Chu as Ceci Koo Ka-sin
Law Kwan-moon as Cheung Pak-chuen
Cilla Kung as Chung Ka-bo
Brian Chu as Mok Chak-kei
Dickson Wong as Fan Tai
Calvin Chan as Chiang Chun
Angel Chiang as Lin Li Xiang/Yumi

Awards and nominations

43rd Ming Pao Anniversary Awards 2011
 My Most Supportive Performance (Linda Chung)
 Nominated: Outstanding Actress in Television (Linda Chung)

45th TVB Anniversary Awards 2011
  Won: Most Improved Male Artiste (Jin Au-yeung) 
 Nominated: Best Drama (Top 5)
 Nominated: Best Actor (Moses Chan) Top 5
 Nominated: Best Actress (Linda Chung) Top 5
 Nominated: Best Supporting Actor (Lok-lam Law)
 Nominated: Best Supporting Actress (Queenie Chu)
 Nominated: My Favourite Male Character (Moses Chan)
 Nominated: My Favourite Female Character (Linda Chung) Top 5
 Nominated: Most Improved Female Artiste (Cilia Kung)

16th Asian Television Awards 2011
 Nominated: Best Comedy Performance by an Actor/Actress (Moses Chan)

Viewership ratings

<Yes Sir, Sorry Sir> in Episode 27, When Linda Chung < Miss Koo> crumble, Average Points 34 and Peaking Points 38

International Broadcast
  - 8TV (Malaysia)

Notes
a  The original title "點解阿Sir係阿Sir" was actually written in Cantonese; the title of the drama could be translated in Mandarin as "為何阿Sir是阿Sir"

References

External links
TVB.com Yes Sir, Sorry Sir - Official Website 
K for TVB English Synopsis 

TVB dramas
2011 Hong Kong television series debuts
2011 Hong Kong television series endings
Triad (organized crime)